Pseudobatos is a genus of fish in the Rhinobatidae family. Although its constituent species were previously assigned to Rhinobatos, recent authors treat it as distinct.

They are found in warmer coastal parts of the Americas, ranging from northern Chile to California (USA) on the Pacific side, and from northeastern Argentina to North Carolina (USA) on the Atlantic side. They are brownish or grayish above, and reach up to  depending on the exact species.

Species
There are nine currently recognized species in this genus:
 Pseudobatos buthi K.M. Rutledge, 2019 (Spadenose guitarfish) 
 Pseudobatos glaucostigmus (D. S. Jordan & C. H. Gilbert, 1883) (Speckled guitarfish)
 Pseudobatos horkelii (J. P. Müller & Henle, 1841) (Brazilian guitarfish)
 Pseudobatos lentiginosus (Garman, 1880) (Atlantic guitarfish)
 Pseudobatos leucorhynchus (Günther, 1867) (Whitesnout guitarfish)
 Pseudobatos percellens (Walbaum, 1792) (Chola guitarfish)
 Pseudobatos planiceps (Garman, 1880) (Pacific guitarfish)
 Pseudobatos prahli (Acero P & Franke, 1995) (Gorgona guitarfish)
 Pseudobatos productus (Ayres, 1854) (Shovelnose guitarfish)

References

 
Ray genera